About to Get Real is the third studio album by American country music artist Easton Corbin. It was released on June 30, 2015 via Mercury Nashville. It includes the singles "Clockwork", "Baby Be My Love Song". and "Yup". It also includes "Are You with Me" from Corbin's previous album, All Over the Road. The album was produced by Carson Chamberlain.

Content
About the album, Corbin said, "When deciding on an album title, About to Get Real just says it all for me. When country fans listen to this album, I want them to take away that even though the music mixes the modern with the classic, it's entirely real. Like the music of my heroes, it's the real deal." The album's track listing was announced on June 9.

Critical reception
Stephen Thomas Erlewine of AllMusic gave the album 3.5 stars out of 5 and wrote that "No matter what the album title implies – "real" usually conveys grit, a quality conspicuously absent from these 12 songs – About to Get Real is so smooth it sometimes suggests the glory days of Urban Cowboy, when modern country flirted heavily with the soft rock mainstream."

Commercial performance
The album debuted at No. 1 on the Top Country Albums chart, and No. 13 on the Billboard 200, with 20,000 copies sold in the US in its first week. The album has sold 59,800 copies in the US as of May 2016.

Track listing

Personnel
 Eddie Bayers – drums
 Jimmy Carter – bass guitar
 Easton Corbin – lead vocals
 J.T. Corenflos – electric guitar, resonator guitar
 Larry Franklin – fiddle
 Paul Franklin – steel guitar
 Brent Mason – electric guitar
 Gary Prim – Hammond B-3 organ, keyboards, piano, Wurlitzer
 John Wesley Ryles – background vocals
 W. David Smith – bass guitar
 Russell Terrell – background vocals
 Biff Watson – banjo, bouzouki, acoustic guitar
 Glenn Worf – bass guitar

Chart performance

Weekly charts

Year-end charts

Singles

References

2015 albums
Easton Corbin albums
Mercury Nashville albums
Albums produced by Carson Chamberlain